Mussau Island is the largest island of St Matthias Islands, Papua New Guinea, at . It is currently part of the New Ireland Province of Papua New Guinea. The island is a noted biodiversity hotspot with pristine primeval rainforest covering most of Mussau's hilly landscape. The island has over 243 endemic plant species as well as at least 47 native butterfly species.

References 
https://asiapacific.anu.edu.au/mapsonline/base-maps/mussau-island

https://www.researchgate.net/publication/280134331_A

External links 
 OrchidsPNG.com

Islands of Papua New Guinea
Bismarck Archipelago
New Ireland Province
Volcanoes of Papua New Guinea